Little Packington is a hamlet and civil parish in the North Warwickshire district of the county of Warwickshire, England. It is situated just to the northwest of Great Packington and outside the boundaries of Packington Park. Population details can be found under Coleshill. There is a small church dedicated to St Bartholomew. It is of Norman origin with medieval timber framing and 17th-century internal additions. It has however been converted for use as a private dwelling and access is granted only on special request. 1½ miles northeast of the church is Hermitage Manor, dating from the 12th century; remnants of its buildings and moat still exist today. There is also an ancient sandstone footbridge, adjacent to a ford which crosses the river Blythe.

An "iconic" landfill site in the area closed in 2015.

References

External links

Bioenergy in the United Kingdom
Landfills in the United Kingdom
Villages in Warwickshire